Sigmundur Ernir Rúnarsson (born 6 March 1961) is a member of parliament of the Althing, the Icelandic parliament. He is a member of the Social Democratic Alliance. He has been a member of the Icelandic Delegation to the Inter-Parliamentary Union since 2010.

External links
Althing biography

Living people
1961 births
Sigmundur Ernir Runarsson
Sigmundur Ernir Runarsson